Route 77 is a state highway in the southern part of the U.S. state of New Jersey. It runs  from an intersection with Route 49 in Bridgeton in Cumberland County north to a junction with Route 45 in Mullica Hill in Gloucester County. It is a mostly two-lane, undivided road traversing through farmland in Cumberland, Salem, and Gloucester Counties. Along the way, Route 77 intersects Route 56 in Upper Deerfield Township and U.S. Route 40 (US 40) in Upper Pittsgrove Township.

Prior to 1927, the route was a branch of pre-1927 Route 6 that ran from Bridgeton to Mullica Hill. In 1927, it was designated as Route 46, which replaced the Bridgeton-Mullica Hill branch of pre-1927 Route 6. In 1953, it was renumbered to Route 77 to avoid conflicting with US 46 in the northern part of the state.

Route description

Route 77 heads north from Route 49 and County Route 609 (CR 609) in Bridgeton, Cumberland County on Pearl Street. In a short distance, the route intersects CR 670 and then crosses CR 552, which ends a block to the west at Laurel Street. It continues north through residential areas of Bridgeton, meeting CR 665 and CR 659. Route 77 heads into a commercial area, passing under a Winchester and Western Railroad line and crossing into Upper Deerfield Township at the junction with Laurel Plaza Drive. The route intersects the western terminus of Route 56 and CR 622, where the route is briefly a four-lane road. Past this junction, Route 77 heads into farmland, where it encounters several county roads including CR 704, CR 617, and CR 658. It heads north into Seabrook, where it meets CR 743 and CR 711. Route 77 intersects CR 612 and CR 630 before crossing CR 540 in Deerfield. Past CR 540, the route has junctions with CR 640 and CR 730. Route 77 then encounters CR 614, the last county route intersection in Cumberland County.

Route 77 crosses into Upper Pittsgrove Township, Salem County, where it becomes Pole Tavern-Bridgeton Road, and crosses CR 611 in Shirley. It continues north through farms to Pole Tavern, where Route 77 meets US 40, CR 604, and CR 635 at Pole Tavern Circle. Past the Pole Tavern Circle, the route becomes Bridgeton Pike and crosses CR 660. Before leaving Salem County, Route 77 intersects two more county routes: CR 619 and CR 666.

Route 77 crosses Oldmans Creek into Elk Township, Gloucester County, meeting CR 641 and CR 616 before crossing CR 538. Past this junction, the route crosses CR 618 and enters Harrison Township. Route 77 continues northwest and enters Mullica Hill, where it intersects the northern terminus of CR 581 and heads north on South Main Street. Route 77 ends at Route 45, where Route 45 continues to the north on South Main Street.

History

Prior to 1927, the route was a branch of pre-1927 Route 6, which had run south from Camden and split into two branches in Mullica Hill that ran to Salem and Bridgeton. In the 1927 New Jersey state highway renumbering, Route 46 was designated along the former branch of pre-1927 Route 6 that ran from Bridgeton to Mullica Hill. In the 1953 New Jersey state highway renumbering, which stated that no state route and U.S. route could share the same number, Route 46 was changed to Route 77 to avoid a conflict with US 46 in North Jersey.

Major intersections

See also

References

External links

NJ State Highways: Route 77
Route 77 Photos
New Jersey Route 77: Start / End Photos
Speed Limits for State Roads: Route 77

077
Transportation in Cumberland County, New Jersey
Transportation in Gloucester County, New Jersey
Transportation in Salem County, New Jersey